Węgorza  is a village in the administrative district of Gmina Osina, within Goleniów County, West Pomeranian Voivodeship, in north-western Poland. 

The village has a population of 420.

References

Villages in Goleniów County